Izdebno may refer to the following places:
Izdebno, Kuyavian-Pomeranian Voivodeship (north-central Poland)
Izdebno, Lublin Voivodeship (east Poland)
Izdebno, Masovian Voivodeship (east-central Poland)
Izdebno, Międzychód County in Greater Poland Voivodeship (west-central Poland)
Izdebno, Słupca County in Greater Poland Voivodeship (west-central Poland)
Izdebno, West Pomeranian Voivodeship (north-west Poland)